Boston Metros were an American soccer club based in Boston, Massachusetts that were a member of the American Soccer League. In their second season, the Metros joined the Eastern Professional Soccer Conference. After the EPSC folded at the end of its only season, the Metros returned to the ASL as the Boston Tigers.

Year-by-year

References

American Soccer League (1933–1983) teams
Tigers
Defunct soccer clubs in Massachusetts